Die Tonight Live Forever is the second single of the debut album by Innerpartysystem. The track has been featured on both Scuzz, Kerrang!, and is available for selection on Virgin Media On Demand. The single was only released United Kingdom (as was the previous single).

Track listing

2008 singles
2008 songs
Island Records singles
Innerpartysystem songs